Ibos may refer to:

 The Igbo or Ibo people, an ethnic group of Nigeria
 Ibos, a commune of the Hautes-Pyrénées département, in southwestern France.
 IBOS Association, an international banking association
 Ibo Eshak; Ibohammad Eshakur, a popular internet icon.